The  is a limited express service operated by the East Japan Railway Company (JR East), which mainly run between  and  via the Chūō Main Line and Shinonoi Line. The name Azusa is taken from the Azusa River in Matsumoto, Nagano. On the Chūō Main Line, limited express Kaiji also runs between  / , and  / .

The Super Azusa was a former name given to services operated with superior tilt-body rolling stock, namely the E351 series, and the E353 series (prior to 16 March 2019).

Service pattern and stops 
As of 16 March 2019, 18 round trips are operated every day. All trains run on the Chūō Main Line and Shinonoi Line, with few of them also running on the Sōbu Main Line and Ōito Line.

Stops 

 No brackets denote stations that most or all Azusa services stop.
 Round brackets denote stations that some Azusa services stop.
 Square brackets【】denote stations / sections that very few Azusa services stop.
 This list is a generalised list, so please check the official timetables for stops of a particular Azusa service.

【Chiba - Funabashi - Kinshichō / Tokyo】 - Shinjuku - Tachikawa - Hachiōji - Ōtsuki - Kōfu - (Nirasaki) -  Kobuchizawa -【Fujimi】 - Chino - Kami-Suwa - 【Shimo-Suwa】 - Okaya - Shiojiri - Matsumoto - 【Toyoshina - Hotaka - Shinano-Ōmachi - Hakuba - Minami-Otari】

Ticketing 
A limited express ticket has to be purchased to board an Azusa train, along with the basic fare ticket.

The Reserved Seat Ticket enables a specified seat to be reserved for the holder. The reserved status for the seat is signified by a green overhead lamp on top of the corresponding seat.

The Unreserved Seat Ticket enables the holder to be seated on any unreserved seat. A red overhead lamp signifies that the seat is unreserved; while a yellow overhead lamp signifies that the seat is reserved for the later part of the journey, implying that one has to give up their seat to the passenger who has reserved the seat, when they board the train later.

Extra services

Kiso Azusa 
The extra train operated on the Chūō Main Line between Shinjuku to Nagiso, via Tatsuno. With consideration that tourists would be staying the night around the area, the inbound train to Shinjuku was operated the day after the outbound train to Nagiso has arrived.

In 2018, the train operated 2 round trips during the campaign duration.

Stops 
Shinjuku - Tachikawa - Hachiōji - Kōfu - Chino - Kami-Suwa - Okaya - Tatsuno - Shiojiri - Narai - Kiso-Fukushima - Nagiso

Rolling stock 

 189 series 6-car EMUs (Ordinary class, reserved seats only)

Rolling stock
 E353 series EMUs (since 23 December 2017)

From 23 December 2017, new E353 series EMUs were introduced on Super Azusa services. By March 2018, all Super Azusa services were replaced by E353 series trains, and the E257 series trainsets used on Azusa services by 16 March 2019. Following the unification of all Super Azusa and Azusa services into E353 series, the name Super Azusa was abolished.

Rolling stock previously used
 181 series 10-car EMUs (from 1966)
 183 series EMUs (from 1972)
 165 series EMUs (from 1966)
 E351 series EMUs (Super Azusa, from December 1993 to March 2018)
E257 series EMUs (from December 2001 to 16 March 2019, still used on extra services)
 189 series EMUs (from 1975)

Formations

Current formation

Azusa (E353 series) 
All Azusa services (E353 series) are formed of nine cars as shown below, numbered 4 to 12, with car 4 at the Shinjuku end.

Past formations

Azusa (E257 series)
Azusa services (E257 series) were formed of 2+9-car or 9-car sets as shown below, with car 1 at the southern (Chiba/Tokyo/Shinjuku) end. All cars were no-smoking.

Super Azusa (E353 series)
From March 2018 to March 2019, Super Azusa services were formed of 3+9-car E353 series trainsets as shown below, with car 1 at the southern (Tokyo/Shinjuku) end. All cars were no-smoking. There were days when car 3 operates as a reserved seating car.

History

The Azusa service began on 1 October 1957 as a semi express operating between Shinjuku and Matsumoto. This operated until 24 April 1960 when it was absorbed into Hakuba semi express services.

The Azusa name was revived from 12 December 1966 for use on limited express services operating between Shinjuku and Matsumoto.

The premier Super Azusa service commenced on 3 December 1994 with the delivery of the first new E351 series tilting EMUs.

New E257 series EMUs were introduced on Azusa services from the start of the revised timetable on 1 December 2001.

Smoking was prohibited in all cars from 18 March 2007.

From 16 March 2019 onwards, with the replacement of E257 series trains to E353 series trains on all Azusa services, the name Super Azusa were discontinued and were integrated with Azusa services.

See also
 List of named passenger trains of Japan
 Kaiji, another limited express service operated on the Chuo Line

References

External links

JR E257 Azusa/Kaiji 
JR E351 Super Azusa 

Named passenger trains of Japan
East Japan Railway Company
Railway services introduced in 1957
1957 establishments in Japan